The 2012 Eastern New Mexico Greyhounds football represents Eastern New Mexico University in the 2012 NCAA Division II football season as a member of the Lone Star Conference (LSC). Led by first-year head coach Josh Lynn, the Greyhounds finished the season 3–7 overall with a conference mark of 2–6, placing seventh.

Previous season
Eastern New Mexico went winless, finishing 0–9 overall and 0–7 in conference play.

Recruiting
Head coach Josh Lynn brought in 14 new recruits before the season started

Preseaon

Eastern New Mexico was picked to finish 8th in the 2012 LSC preseason poll.

Schedule

References

Eastern New Mexico
Eastern New Mexico Greyhounds football seasons
Eastern New Mexico Greyhounds football